The Play-offs of the 2011 Fed Cup Americas Zone Group I were the final stages of the Group I Zonal Competition involving teams from the Americas. Using the positions determined in their pools, the nine teams faced off to determine their placing in the 2012 Fed Cup Americas Zone Group I, the top countries of each pool played for first to second, while the bottom two of each pool competed for sixth and ninth. The top team advanced to World Group II play-offs, and the bottom two teams were relegated down to the Americas Zone Group II for the next year.

Promotion play-offs
The first placed teams of each pool were drawn in a head-to-head round. The winner of the round advanced to the World Group II play-offs, where they would get a chance to advanced to World Group II.

Argentina vs. Colombia

3rd to 4th play-offs
The second placed teams of each pool were drawn in head-to-head rounds to find the third and fourth placed teams.

Canada vs. Paraguay

Relegation play-offs
The last placed teams of each pool were drawn in head-to-head rounds. The loser of each round was relegated down to Americas Zone Group II in 2013.

Peru vs. Bolivia

Bahamas vs. Venezuela

Final placements

  advanced to World Group II play-offs where they were drawn against . They won 4–1, and thus proceeded to World Group II for 2013.

See also
 Fed Cup structure

References

External links
 Fed Cup website

2012 Fed Cup Americas Zone